Mubin Asrorovich Ergashev (born 6 October 1973) is a Tajik professional football former player and current head coach of Lokomotiv-Pamir and Tajikistan U19. Ergashev is also currently the Interim Head Coach of Tajikistan.

Career

Managerial
On 13 January 2014, Ergashev was appointed as manager of FC Istiklol. In July 2015, following the resignation of Mukhsin Mukhamadiev, Ergashev also took up the managers job of the Tajikistan national team.

In December 2015 Ergashev was awarded an UEFA Pro coaching license. Following Tajikistan's disappointing 2018 FIFA World Cup qualifying campaign, Ergashev and his staff were relieved of their duties.

On 10 July 2016, FC Istiklol fired their entire coaching staff, including manager Ergashev.

On 9 June 2017, Barkchi appointed Ergashev as their manager after Vitaliy Levchenko joined the coaching staff of Krylia Sovetov. On 13 April 2021, FC Istiklol announced Ergashev as their interim manager for their AFC Champions League group games due to having the required Pro Coaching License Vitaliy Levchenko did not.

On 8 November, Ergashev was announced as Tajikistan's Interim Head Coach for their game against Kazakhstan.

Coaching statistics

Honours

Manager
 Istiklol
 Tajik League (2): 2014, 2015
 Tajik Cup (2):2014, 2015
 Tajik Super Cup (3): 2014, 2015, 2016

References

External links

1973 births
Living people
Tajikistani football managers
Tajikistan national football team managers
Tajikistani footballers
Soviet footballers
Association football midfielders